Qinhuangdao Wildlife Park is a safari park located in Qinhuangdao in northeast China. It was opened in 1995 and is the country's second largest wildlife park. The park covers an area of some 5,000 acres and is home to roughly 7,000 animals of more than 150 species, including tigers, white tigers, lions, bears, elephants, and a range of birds. Visitors can travel through the park by foot, car or train.

History
On 12 August 2015, a female tourist was killed when she was attacked by one of the tigers while driving through the safari park. She was attacked when she left her car, which is against park rules.

References

External links

Safari parks
Amusement parks in China
Zoos in China
1995 establishments in China
Zoos established in 1995
Qinhuangdao